Elizabeth S. Wiskemann is the widow of Martin Wiskemann, a Swiss businessman who made his fortune managing a precious metal fund. Elizabeth Wiskemann closely guards her privacy, and as a result is the only member of the Forbes 400 who is of unknown age. Wiskemann owns 6% of Franklin Resources.

References

External links
#235 ($1.4 billion) on 2005 Forbes 400
#327 ($950 million) on 2004 Forbes 400 (first appearance) 
#354 ($1.1 billion) on 2006 Forbes 400
#486 ($1.6 billion) on 2006 World's Richest People 

Living people
Year of birth missing (living people)
Swiss billionaires